The Midland School is located in Paramus, Bergen County, New Jersey, United States. The schoolhouse was built in 1876 and added to the National Register of Historic Places on April 7, 1978. The building is currently used as the Charles E. Reid branch of the Paramus Public Library and should not be confused with the later-built elementary school next door which is also named Midland School.

See also
National Register of Historic Places listings in Bergen County, New Jersey

References

School buildings completed in 1876
Buildings and structures in Bergen County, New Jersey
Paramus, New Jersey
National Register of Historic Places in Bergen County, New Jersey
New Jersey Register of Historic Places